Sincheon Station is a station of the Daegu Subway Line 1 in Sincheon-dong, Dong District, Daegu, South Korea.
Kyungpook National University is nearby.
A stair was removed at entrance 4 and an escalator was put in its place.

References

External links 

 DTRO virtual station

Dong District, Daegu
Daegu Metro stations
Railway stations opened in 1998